This is a list of diplomatic missions in Niue, a small Pacific island country in Oceania.  Although Niue is an associated state of New Zealand, . At present, the capital of Alofi hosts two missions. Additionally there are embassies accredited to Niue and residing outside the country.

High Commissions

In Alofi

Non-resident embassies

See also
Foreign relations of Niue
List of diplomatic missions of Niue

Notes

References

External links
 Government of Niue
 Niue Diplomatic and Consular Corps 2005

Foreign relations of Niue
Niue
Diplomatic missions

Diplomatic missions